Gross Reken Melchenberg Radio Tower ( "Melchenberg Radio Tower"), or simply the Melchenberg Radio Tower, is a German concrete radio tower that is located in the municipality of Reken, in the state of North Rhine-Westphalia. Like the Melchenberg Observation Tower, it is a lattice tower that is currently being used as means of communication. Although its construction date is unknown, it was formerly used by the military. Its antenna's height is 70 metres long.

Geography

The Melchenberg Radio Tower is situated alongside the Melchenberg Observation Tower in the municipality of Reken, which is located in the populous state of North Rhine-Westphalia. Its postal code is 48734.

See also

Lattice tower
Schomberg Observation Tower
Gillerberg Observation Tower
Gustav-Vietor-Tower
Madona Radio Towers
Reken
North Rhine-Westphalia

References

External links
SkyscraperPage Forum
Structurae

Towers completed in 2002
Communication towers in Germany
2002 establishments in Germany